Vianen may refer to:

 Vianen, a city in Utrecht, the Netherlands
 Vianen (North Brabant), a hamlet in the Netherlands
 Vianen (Zeeland), a former hamlet in the Netherlands
 Vianen (ship), a sailing ship

People
Gerard Vianen (born 1944), Dutch cyclist